The Aquarium of the Pacific (formerly the Long Beach Aquarium of the Pacific) is a public aquarium on a  site on Rainbow Harbor in Long Beach, California, United States. It is situated across the water from the Long Beach Convention Center, Shoreline Village, and the Queen Mary Hotel and Attraction.

The aquarium sees 1.5 million visitors a year and has a total staff of about 1,875 people, including more than 1,500 volunteers and about 375 employees. It is a 501(c)(3) non-profit aquarium.

The aquarium is an accredited member of the Association of Zoos and Aquariums (AZA).

The aquarium also has a Website where admission tickets are available as well as many other features. On the website there are webcams available that give you a live look into some exhibits from the comfort of your own home. Under the "Events" tab there are resources with everything you will need to know about what the aquarium has going on in the future. There is also a place where anyone of all ages nine and above can apply to volunteer or even donate to "adopt a animal".

Exhibits
The aquarium features a collection of over 11,000 animals representing over 500 different species in exhibits ranging in size and capacity from about 5,000 to 350,000 gallons. Exhibits introduce the inhabitants and seascapes of the Pacific, while also focusing on specific conservation messages associated with each region. The Pacific Ocean is the focus of three major permanent galleries, sunny Southern California and Baja, the frigid waters of the Northern Pacific and the colorful reefs of the Tropical Pacific.

Southern California & Baja Gallery
The Southern California & Baja Gallery features the varied habitats of this region. The first exhibit is the  three-story Blue Cavern tank, which houses animals that live in the waters surrounding nearby Catalina Island. Next is the Amber Forest exhibit, which replicates a Giant kelp forest with Garibaldi, California scorpionfish, and other representative organisms. The Gulf of California exhibit houses Cortez rainbow wrasse, Mexican lookdowns, porcupine fish, and others. Other areas of the gallery include the  Seal and Sea Lion Habitat, Ray Touch Pool, and Shorebird Sanctuary.

Northern Pacific Gallery
The Northern Pacific Gallery focuses on organisms from the Bering Sea. Exhibits include the Sea Otter Habitat, home to southern sea otters; the giant Pacific octopus tank; and Diving Birds, where puffins and auklets live. Other species on display include Japanese spider crabs, jellyfish, and sea anemones.

Tropical Pacific Gallery
The Tropical Pacific Gallery exhibits animals off the coast of the islands of Palau and has the aquarium's largest tank, the  Tropical Reef Habitat. This tank houses olive ridley sea turtles, zebra sharks, and many other species. Elsewhere in the Gallery are big-belly seahorses, leafy seadragons, weedy seadragons, and sea kraits.

Explorer's Cove

The aquarium's main outdoor area, Explorer's Cove, encompasses the Shark Lagoon and Lorikeet Forest, Moon Jellies and The Steel Trout/Rainbow Trout tank. Also available are shops with aquarium merchandise and even a smoothie shop that offers a variety of smoothies and small snacks.

Shark Lagoon
This  exhibit area houses over 150 sharks and rays. The main tank houses larger spec rays, blacktip reef sharks, grey reef sharks, zebra sharks, and a sand tiger shark, while the more docile bamboo and epaulette sharks live in the three touch pools. Guests are able to touch these sharks and rays with two fingers as directed by the volunteers and staff.

Lorikeet Forest
Guests may feed them small amounts of nectar for a fee.

June Keyes Penguin Habitat
This exhibit for the Magellanic penguin opened in May 2012. An underwater crawl-in space allows guests to view the penguins from within the tank.

Pacific Visions 
In 2018, the aquarium opened a new wing named Pacific Visions, which houses a 266-seat 4D theater with a 30 foot tall, 180 degree wraparound screen. The film is 8 minutes long, and free with aquarium admission. The wing also features new animal exhibits, including a cleaner shrimp touch tank, and several interactive art installations.

Seals and Sea Lions Habitat 
This habitat is home to the aquarium's Sea Lions as well as Harbor Seals. These seals often perform shows that are very informational about the seals. There are opportunities for guests to actually go into the habitat and feed the seals sardines. For guests still in the stands you may see the seals perform tricks or let out very loud yells that are entertaining to witness.

Other attractions
In spring 2010, the aquarium opened a new  Earth-Friendly Garden on its front lawn. The garden features California native and drought-resistant plants, as well as a very efficient irrigation system, to show part of the solution to Southern California's ongoing water shortage problems.

Activities
The Aquarium of the Pacific's marine science and conservation ventures include: breeding and conservation programs for endangered marine animals and habitats; housing of unreleasable seals, sea lions, and sea otters from local care centers and marine parks; beach and habitat cleanups; a variety of green business practices; and continuing efforts to educate visitors on the importance the ocean, its threats, and conservation, including the hazards of marine pollution, over-harvesting, habitat destruction and global climate change. One example is a trashion festival with works by Marina DeBris educating about ocean pollution.

The Aquarium of the Pacific is also home to many cultural events throughout the year, such as the Pacific Islander Festival in the summer, the Moompetam Festival in the fall, special treats for the animals at Christmas, the Festival of Human Abilities in January, and the African Heritage Festival in February.

In partnership with some of the local whale watching tourboats guests are able to buy bundle tickets that allow for admission into the aquarium and a three hour long trip into the Pacific Ocean off the Californian coast. Guests have the opportunity to see many different whales, dolphins and other sealife. Most commonly seen are Gray Whales, Humpback Whales and Bottlenose Dolphins.

Architecture

The aquarium architecture is inspired by the towering, breaking waves of the Pacific and mirrors the fluid and dynamic temper of the ocean. Kajima International, developers of the world's most critically acclaimed and technologically advanced aquariums, was the developer of the Aquarium of the Pacific and architects included the Los Angeles office of Hellmuth, Obata & Kassanbaum and Esherick Homsey Dodge and Davis of San Francisco. Construction was a joint venture of Turner Construction Company and Kajima International. On June 20, 1998, construction was completed and the aquarium opened to the public.

Gallery

References

External links
 
 

Aquaria in California
Downtown Long Beach
Museums in Long Beach, California